Kirkimbie Station is a pastoral lease that operates as a cattle station in the Northern Territory of Australia.

It can support a herd of approximately 11,000 head of cattle and has an annual turn-off of about 5,500 head.

The property was owned by Vestey Group in the 1960s and was acquired by Consolidated Pastoral Company in 1986. Another of the company's properties, Bunda Station, acquired in 2014 borders Kirkimbie.

See also
List of ranches and stations

References

Pastoral leases in the Northern Territory
Stations (Australian agriculture)